The Angola Women's Handball League is the top tier handball competition in Angola for women.

Summary
The winners are:

 Round robin tournament.

Participation details

National Champions

See also
 Federação Angolana de Andebol
 Angola women's national handball team

References

 
Handball competitions in Angola
Angola